The 2017–18 Central Michigan Chippewas women's basketball team represents Central Michigan University during the 2017–18 NCAA Division I women's basketball season. The Chippewas, led by eleventh year head coach Sue Guevara, play their home games at McGuirk Arena as members of the West Division of the Mid-American Conference. They finished the season 30–5, 16–1 in MAC play to win MAC West Division. They won the MAC women's tournament and earns an automatic to the NCAA women's tournament where they upset LSU in the first round to win their first NCAA tournament win in school history, Ohio State in the second round to advanced to the sweet sixteen for the first time in school history. They lost to Oregon. With 30 wins, they finish with the most wins in school history.

Roster

Schedule

|-
!colspan=9 style=| Non-conference regular season

|-
!colspan=9 style=| MAC regular season

|-
!colspan=9 style=| MAC Women's Tournament

|-
!colspan=9 style=| NCAA Women's Tournament

Rankings
2017–18 NCAA Division I women's basketball rankings

See also
 2017–18 Central Michigan Chippewas men's basketball team

References

Central Michigan
Central Michigan Chippewas women's basketball seasons
Central Michigan
Central Michigan
Central Michigan